The Boomtown Rats are an Irish rock band originally formed in Dublin in 1975. Between 1977 and 1985, they had a series of Irish and UK hits including "Like Clockwork", "Rat Trap", "I Don't Like Mondays" and "Banana Republic". The original line-up comprised five musicians from Dún Laoghaire in County Dublin; Gerry Cott (rhythm guitar), Simon Crowe (drums), Johnnie Fingers (keyboards), Bob Geldof (vocals) and Garry Roberts (lead guitar), plus Fingers' cousin Pete Briquette (bass). The Boomtown Rats broke up in 1986, but reformed in 2013, without Fingers or Cott. Garry Roberts died in 2022. The band's fame and notability have been overshadowed by the charity work of frontman Bob Geldof, a former journalist with the New Musical Express.

History

Beginnings
The band was formed in 1975 with five of the six members that originated from Dún Laoghaire, while Pete Briquette was originally from  Ballyjamesduff, County Cavan, Ireland. Geldof initially managed the band but took over the lead vocals from Garry Roberts. Initially known as The Nightlife Thugs, the group changed their name to The Boomtown Rats, which Geldof had taken from Woody Guthrie's autobiography Bound for Glory.

In the summer of 1976, the group played their first UK gig before moving to London where they signed with Ensign Records later that year. Their first single, "Lookin' After No. 1", released in August 1977 after a year of touring, including a support slot with Tom Petty. It reached the Top 40 of the UK Singles Chart at No. 11. Their first album The Boomtown Rats was released the following month and included another single, "Mary of the 4th Form" reached No. 15 in December. Music journalist Martin C. Strong commented, "Geldof's moody charisma helped to give the band a distinct identity".

Mainstream success 
The band together with producer Mutt Lange embarked on recording their next album, A Tonic for the Troops (1978). In May, the first single "She's So Modern" reached No. 12 in UK charts. A headlining tour around the UK culminates in a show filmed at the Hammersmith Odeon. The second single "Like Clockwork" reached the UK Top Ten at No. 6 in July.  The album was released shortly after, while in early November, the third single "Rat Trap" became the first rock song by an Irish band to reach No. 1 in the UK. In addition, "Rat Trap" was also the first new wave song to claim the number one spot. The US version of the album (with a slightly different selection of tracks) came out the next year on Columbia Records. 

The band returned to the recording studio with Lange to produce a follow up in 1979, while they embarked on a US tour in support of the album with moderate success. The single  "I Don't Like Mondays" was released in July, also reached No. 1 in the UK.  The song was written in response to a school shooting in California, and became a worldwide Top Ten hit, except for the United States. It was the band's only song to reach the US Billboard Hot 100 and was included in the band's third album, The Fine Art of Surfacing released in November of that year. The album also contained "Diamond Smiles" and their next Top 10 hit in the UK, "Someone's Looking at You".

In 1980 "Banana Republic" was released, which was their last Top 10 hit, and in the following year the Boomtown Rats' next studio album Mondo Bongo was issued.

Cott's departure
Cott departed from the band at this point. According to Bob Geldof's autobiography, Is That It?, Cott had grown disillusioned with what he saw as the band's growing laziness in the studio, and their apparent relinquishing of their early R&B influences in favour of "cod-reggae". Throughout his time with the band, Cott had maintained a distance between himself and the other members and he resigned the day before the end of their 1981 world tour, only hours after the rest of the band had decided to confront him for refusing to join them and the road crew for a drink to celebrate Simon Crowe's birthday.

Cott had a short-lived solo career, releasing two UK singles, "The Ballad of the Lone Ranger" and "Pioneers" and the 1984 Canadian single "Alphabet Town".

V Deep
The band's fifth album, V Deep, was released in February 1982. The first single was "Never in a Million Years" which did not sell well, while the follow-up "House on Fire" made number 24 in the UK Singles Chart. In the US, the album was initially rejected by their American label, which instead issued a four-song EP called The Boomtown Rats, featuring four selections from V Deep. The full album was eventually issued in the US in late 1982.

A follow-up album entitled In The Long Grass was recorded in 1983, but was initially rejected by the group's label. By 1984, the band was touring universities after becoming unable to fund the "guarantee" required to book mainstream concert halls. In The Long Grass was finally issued in the UK in May 1984, but failed to chart. Two singles, "Tonight" and "Drag Me Down", were taken from the album; these reached the lower rungs of the UK Singles Chart, but two further singles, "Dave" and "A Hold of Me", failed to register.

The Boomtown Rats' involvement with Band Aid (on which they all played) raised their profile again, and in January 1985, a revised version of In the Long Grass was finally released in the US. The album made the US charts at No. 188, but the associated singles failed to make an impact on the charts or on the radio. The band subsequently performed at Live Aid's charity performance.

"Dave", a single from the original release of In the Long Grass was re-recorded as "Rain" for the US market. The song was about the band's saxophone player and school friend David MacHale (died 2009), who had suffered a breakdown after his girlfriend was found dead in a public toilet next to an empty heroin bag. The 'Rain' metaphor in the altered lyrics referenced Duran Duran's earlier song "Hold Back the Rain", where Geldof's friend Simon Le Bon pleaded with an unnamed band member to cease dabbling with narcotics.

Rats split
After Live Aid, the band was mothballed while Geldof wound up his affairs with the Band Aid Trust, during which time he succeeded in getting them a one-album deal with Vertigo Records. However, both Crowe and Fingers refused to rejoin the Boomtown Rats full-time, preferring to pursue their own band, Gung Ho.

The band's final performance came at Self Aid, a 1986 concert featuring many Irish rock stars, to raise awareness of unemployment in Ireland. Their rendition of "Joey's on the Street Again" was 12 minutes long, with an extended bridge, during which time Geldof ran among the crowd. It also included a rendition of Woody Guthrie's song "Greenback Dollar", which provided circularity and closure
. Following this performance, Geldof addressed the crowd, saying, "It's been a great ten years; rest in peace". The band then performed "Looking After No.1".

Following the band's break-up, Geldof launched a solo career with Pete Briquette continuing to work alongside him.

Garry Roberts co-wrote songs for Kirsty MacColl before leaving the music business and going on to become a successful salesman of financial services. Roberts later presented his Guitar Workshop to schools, encouraging pupils to play the instrument and emphasising the contribution of the blues to modern rock and pop music.

After Gung Ho split, Fingers became a successful record producer in Japan, as well as being part of the Japanese band Greengate. Simon Crowe was in the West Country-based Celtic instrumental band Jiggerypipery and has also run a clock making business.

In 2005, the band's albums were all remastered and re-released and a 'Best Of' compilation was released, along with two DVDs. Briquette mixed the live DVD and Francesco Cameli mixed the extra tracks for the re-release of the Boomtown Rats albums at Sphere Studios in London.

The Rats
In 2008, Garry Roberts and Simon Crowe, who had continued playing together in The Fab Four, with Alan Perman (ex Herman's Hermits) and Bob Doyle (who once auditioned unsuccessfully for E.L.O.), and The Velcro Flies, with Steve (Dusty) Hill and Gavin Petrie, got together as "The Rats", playing their favourite Boomtown Rats songs, with two guitars, bass and drums. The band was initially fronted by Peter Barton, who since the early 1980s has played with several resurrected acts, including The Animals, The Hollies and Lieutenant Pigeon. Barton was replaced on lead vocals and bass by Bob Bradbury, who was the founder and main songwriter in Hello. Darren Beale, formerly of The Caves, played lead guitar. Saxophone player Andy Hamilton, who toured and recorded with The Boomtown Rats, including at Live Aid, played as a guest at some gigs.

Gerry Cott and Johnnie Fingers were invited to join the band when circumstances allowed. Cott attended The Rats' second gig (at The 100 Club on Oxford Street, London). Fingers, meanwhile, worked for the Fuji Rock Festival in Japan, but planned to join the band on stage when he was in the UK.

On 21 June 2009, Geldof, Roberts, and Briquette got together in Dublin to play "Dave", at a party to celebrate the life of Boomtown Rats' close friend and saxophone player, "Doctor" Dave MacHale, who had died of cancer in Frankfurt. "Dave" was a song Geldof wrote for MacHale in 1983, after MacHale's girlfriend died from a heroin overdose.

On 20 September 2011, Gerry Cott guested with Geldof's band at The Cadogan Hall, London.  They played three Boomtown Rats songs prior to the encores.  Cott returned to the stage for the final encore playing on two Geldof solo songs.

The Boomtown Rats reform
Bob Geldof, Gary Roberts, Pete Briquette, and Simon Crowe reunited as The Boomtown Rats in 2013, joined by Alan Dunn (longtime member of Geldof's band) on Keyboards and Darren Beale (who played with Roberts & Crowe in The Rats) on guitar. Bob Geldof said, "Playing again with the Rats and doing those great songs again will be exciting afresh. We were an amazing band and I just feel it's the right time to re-Rat, to go back to Boomtown for a visit." In June 2013, it was announced that the band would be embarking on a UK and Ireland tour supported by a new compilation album, Back to Boomtown: Classic Rats Hits. The group performed at the Brentwood Festival in 2016, where Geldof attracted controversy for criticising the audience. In April 2017, the band returned to the studio to record new material for their first studio album since In the Long Grass in 1984. In March 2020, they released a new album, Citizens of Boomtown, and a lead single, "Trash Glam Baby".

Members
Current
Bob Geldof – lead vocals, rhythm guitar, harmonica 
Pete Briquette – bass, keyboards, backing vocals 
Simon Crowe – drums, percussion, backing vocals 
With
Alan Dunn - piano, keyboards, backing vocals 
Darren Beale - guitar, keyboards, backing vocals 

Former
Johnnie Fingers – keyboards, piano, backing vocals 
Garry Roberts – lead guitar, backing vocals 
Gerry Cott – rhythm guitar 

Timeline

Discography

Studio albums
 The Boomtown Rats (1977)
 A Tonic for the Troops (1978)
 The Fine Art of Surfacing (1979)
 Mondo Bongo (1981)
 V Deep (1982)
 In the Long Grass (1984)
 Citizens of Boomtown (2020)

UK Top 40 singles
 "Lookin' After No. 1" (1977) No. 11
 "Mary of the 4th Form" (1977) No. 15
 "She's So Modern" (1978) No. 12
 "Like Clockwork" (1978) No. 6
 "Rat Trap" (1978) No. 1
 "I Don't Like Mondays" (1979) No. 1
 "Diamond Smiles" (1979) No. 13
 "Someone's Looking at You" (1980) No. 4
 "Banana Republic" (1980) No. 3
 "The Elephant's Graveyard (Guilty)" (1981) No. 26
 "House on Fire" (1982) No. 24
 "I Don't Like Mondays" (CD single re-issue) (1994) No. 38

See also
List of 1970s one-hit wonders in the United States

References

External links

Boomtown Rats History

Irish new wave musical groups
Irish punk rock groups
Irish rock music groups
Musical groups established in 1975
Musical groups disestablished in 1986
Musical groups from County Dublin
People from Dún Laoghaire
Musical groups reestablished in 2013